There are a number of transport services around the Isle of Man, mostly consisting of paved roads, public transport, rail services, sea ports and an airport.

Roads

Roads are numbered using a numbering scheme similar to the numbering schemes of Great Britain and Northern Ireland; each road is assigned a letter, which represents the road's category, followed by a 1 or 2 digit number. A roads are the main roads of the island whilst roads labelled B, C, D or U decrease in size and/or quality. (The C, D and U numbers are not marked on most maps or on signposts.) There is no national speed limit – some roads may be driven at any speed which is safe and appropriate. Careless and dangerous driving laws still apply, so one may not drive at absolutely any speed, and there are local speed limits on many roads. Many unrestricted roads have frequent bends which even the most experienced driver cannot see round.

Set against this is a strong culture of motor sport enthusiasm (pinnacled in the TT, but there are many events during the year) and many residents familiar with the roads are well used to traversing country roads at speeds illegal on similar roads elsewhere. This leads to a very diverse spread of both driving competence and speed. In an official survey in 2006 the introduction of blanket speed limits was refused by the population, suggesting that a large number appreciate the freedom.

There is a comprehensive bus network, operated by Bus Vannin, a department of the Isle of Man Government, with most routes originating or terminating in Douglas.

An organisation on the Isle of Man called the Fare Free Campaign supports making bus and tram travel on the island free of charge for all routes. One of the reasons the campaign gives for supporting this is to encourage people to change their transportation habits to help mitigate climate change.

Railways

There are seven separate public rail or tram systems on the island:

aReduced in 2019 due to works on the promenade. These works have overrun badly, and as at October 2019 the situation with the horse trams in the 2020 season is uncertain.

(The last three are short-distance tourist rides which cannot be said to be transport services.)

All of these routes are seasonal.

Airports
The only commercial airport on the island is the Isle of Man Airport at Ronaldsway. Scheduled services operate to and from various cities in the United Kingdom and Ireland, operated by several different airlines.

The island's other paved runways are at Jurby and Andreas.  Jurby remains in Isle of Man Government ownership and is used for motorsport events and, previously, airshows, while Andreas is privately owned and used by a local glider club.  The old Hall Caine Airport, a grass field near Ramsey, is no longer used.

Aircraft Register
The Isle of Man Aircraft Register became operational on 1 May 2007. The register is open to all non-commercial aircraft and is intended to be of particular interest to professionally flown corporate operators.
As of November 2012 a total of 537 corporate and private aircraft had been registered.

Ports and harbours

There are ports at Castletown, Douglas, Peel, Port St Mary and Ramsey. Douglas is served by frequent ferries to/from England and occasional ferries to/from Ireland; the sole operator is the Isle of Man Steam Packet Company, with exclusive use of the Isle of Man Sea Terminal and the Douglas port linkspans under the conditions of the user agreement with the Isle of Man Government.

Merchant marine
The Isle of Man register comprised 404 merchant ships of 1,000 GT or over at the end of 2017.

References

External links
Isle of Man Transport (Arraghey Ellan Vannin)
Isle of Man Steam Packet Company
Isle of Man Airport
Isle of Man Aircraft Registry
Searchable Isle of Man Bus/Railway Timetables
Manx Electric Railway Society (MERS)
Archived copy of old MERS site

 
Transport in the Crown Dependencies